Čepin is a village and a municipality in Osijek-Baranja County, Croatia. It is located in northeast Slavonia, 10 kilometers southwest from Osijek.

Čepin, with its 11,599 inhabitants at the 2011 census, is now included in Osijek built-up area. The majority of the population are Croats at 93.8%. Other minorities include Serbs and Hungarians.

There is also an airport, used exclusively for sport and private flying purposes (Sport Airport Čepin).

History
In the late 19th and early 20th century, Čepin was part of the Virovitica County of the Kingdom of Croatia-Slavonia.

Demographics
According to the 2011 census, the Municipality of Čepin had 11,599 inhabitants, making it the third largest municipality in Croatia and largest in Slavonia by population. The village of Čepin itself, with 9,500 inhabitants, is the largest settlement in Croatia which doesn't have a town status (excluding Sesvete), hence sometimes being called the "biggest village in Croatia".

In 2011, the following villages comprised the Čepin municipality:

Beketinci -  613
Čepin - 9,500
Čepinski Martinci - 663
Čokadinci - 173
Livana - 650

The village of Ovčara, which had a population of 1,066 in the 2001 census, was abolished and merged with the settlement of Čepin in 2005.

References

External links
  
 Community website 
 municipality information

Municipalities of Osijek-Baranja County
Slavonia